Alexey Tkachov (born 1 March 1957, Vyselki, Krasnodar Krai) is a Russian political figure and a deputy of the 4th, 5th, 6th, 7th, and 8th State Dumas.

From 1979 to 1992, Tkachov served at the Soviet Armed Forces. After that, he started working at the Vyselki inter-farm feed mill. From 1993 to 2002, he was the deputy of the Legislative Assembly of Krasnodar Krai of the 3rd convocation. From 2000 to 2003, he was a member of the Agrarian Party of Russia. In 2003, he was elected deputy of the 4th State Duma from the Krasnodar Krai constituency. In 2007, 2011, 2016, and 2021, he was re-elected for the 5th, 6th, 7th, and 8th State Dumas, respectively.

Tkachov's younger brother, Alexander Tkachov, is a former Governor of Krasnodar Krai and Minister of Agriculture. 

In 2016, Dissernet found plagiarism in Tkachov's Candidate of Sciences dissertation. 

In 2021, Kolomenskoe Moloko LLC accused Tkachov of using his powers and deputy status to take control of the company. In response, Tkachov refused all the accusations.

Awards 
 Order "For Service to the Homeland in the Armed Forces of the USSR"
 Order "For Merit to the Fatherland"

References

1957 births
Living people
United Russia politicians
21st-century Russian politicians
Eighth convocation members of the State Duma (Russian Federation)
Seventh convocation members of the State Duma (Russian Federation)
Sixth convocation members of the State Duma (Russian Federation)
Fifth convocation members of the State Duma (Russian Federation)
Fourth convocation members of the State Duma (Russian Federation)
People from Vyselkovsky District